Micrococca is a plant genus of the family Euphorbiaceae, first described in 1849. It is native to tropical Africa, Madagascar and Asia (Old World Tropics).

Species

formerly included
moved to Erythrococca 
Micrococca berberidea - Erythrococca berberidea  
Micrococca natalensis - Erythrococca natalensis

References

Acalypheae
Euphorbiaceae genera